Arthur Peak is a  elevation mountain summit located in the Coast Mountains in the U.S. state of Alaska. Its nearest higher neighbor is Peak 3800,  to the northeast. This geographic feature was named in 1888 by Lieutenant Commander C. M. Thomas of the U.S. Navy.

Climate

Based on the Köppen climate classification, Arthur Peak has a subarctic climate with cold, snowy winters, and mild summers. Weather systems coming off the Gulf of Alaska are forced upwards by the Coast Mountains (orographic lift), causing heavy precipitation in the form of rainfall and snowfall. Temperatures can drop below −20 °C with wind chill factors below −30 °C. The month of July offers the most favorable weather for viewing and climbing Arthur Peak.

See also

List of mountain peaks of Alaska
Geography of Alaska

Gallery

References

External links
 Weather forecast: Arthur Peak

Mountains of Alaska
Mountains of Juneau, Alaska
Boundary Ranges
North American 1000 m summits